Astral Weeks is an unauthorized bootleg album of Charles Mingus' music, released by Moon Records in Italy on vinyl and CD in 1990. The material was recorded live in Copenhagen, on April 14, 1964,

The release contains only two tracks: "Fables of Faubus" and "Meditations", although the full performance of his group's music that day also included other compositions that are absent from the Moon releases.

The bootleg was named after the Van Morrison album Astral Weeks.

Personnel
Charles Mingus – bass
Eric Dolphy – alto saxophone, flute, bass clarinet
Clifford Jordan – tenor saxophone
Jaki Byard – piano
Johnny Coles – trumpet
Dannie Richmond – drums

References

Bootleg recordings
Charles Mingus live albums
1964 live albums